Lysergic acid 3-pentyl amide (3-Pentyllysergamide, LSP) is an analogue of LSD originally researched by David E. Nichols and colleagues at Purdue University. It has similar binding affinity to LSD itself as both a 5-HT1A and 5-HT2A agonist, and produces similar behavioral and physiological responses in animals with only slightly lower potency than LSD. Other isomers of this compound have also been explored, with the 1-pentylamide being around 75% the potency of LSD, while the (R)-2-pentylamide shows similar 5-HT2A binding affinity to LSD in vitro but has only around half the potency of LSD in producing drug-appropriate responding in mice, and the (S)-2-pentylamide is inactive.

See also 
 Lysergic acid 2-butyl amide
 Methylisopropyllysergamide

References 

Lysergamides